"Lock U Down" is a song by American singer Mýa on her fourth studio album Liberation (2007). It was written by Harrison along with Jason Boyd, Dwayne Carter, and Scott Storch, with production handled by the latter, and featured Young Money rapper Lil Wayne. The song was released as the album's official leading single after "Ayo!" failed to find success on the charts or at radio and eventually deemed a promotional single only. The lyrics of the R&B-collaboration speak of a woman locking her man down when she has found the right one.

The song received generally mixed reviews from contemporary music critics, who found that "Lock U Down" sounded dated and a poor choice as a single. The song was a commercial disappointment, it failed to chart on Billboards Hot R&B/Hip-Hop Songs chart; peaking below the chart at number one hundred and number one on the Bubbling Under R&B/Hip-Hop Songs chart only. The song's accompanying music video was filmed by director Benny Boom. It featured Harrison and Lil Wayne in abandon warehouse. The video made its world premiere on BET’s 106 & Park on April 25, 2007.

Background
Co-written by Mýa and produced by Scott Storch, "Lock U Down" featuring Lil' Wayne mixes a prominent Eastern harp sample with a guitar riff. A street-but-sweet hip-hop soul jam, it exposes what kind of man a woman wants and needs. Following the commercial disappointment of "Ayo!," Universal Motown delayed Liberations release. Initially, "Lock U Down" leaked in late December 2006.

Critical reception

Upon release "Lock U Down" garnered "mixed" reviews from music critics. Previewed by back in July 2006, the Miami Herald praised "Lock U Down," and described the song as "genius" while commenting,"a rippling rhythm that shows off the rich tones of the underrated singer's voice, with a Middle Eastern counter melody." Writing for Sentinel, editor Brandon Brooks gave "Lock U Down" a favorable review. Brooks deemed "Lock U Down" a sure fire hit; while complimenting on Harrison's vocal performance noting, "She has grown up over the years and sound rejuvenated than ever before." The Guardians Rosie Swash dismissed Lock U Down as a "basic but generally likeable song."

Music video
On April 24, 2007, a day prior to the video's official release, Universal Motown uploaded a 27-minute video teaser. The Benny Boom-directed music video for the track was premiered on 106 & Park on April 25, 2007. The heavy dance-laid video includes Mýa dancing in a seemingly abandoned warehouse. Mýa performs a dance routine with a few back-up dancers during the video. Lil Wayne stands next to Mýa when rapping his verses, and Mýa is sometimes seen mouthing the words to his rap. Towards the end of the video, Mýa is seen partying with a couple of friends.

Track listing

Credits and personnel
Credits lifted from the liner notes of Liberation.

 

Wayne "The Brain" Allison – recording engineer
Jason "Poo Bear" Boyd – writer
Dwayne "Lil Wayne" Carter – vocalist, writer
Vadim "Chise" Chislov – recording engineer assistance
Aaron "Franchise" Fishbein – guitar
 
Conrad Golding – recording engineer
Suha Gur – mastering engineer
Mýa Harrison – vocalist, writer
Fabian Marasciullo – mixing engineer
Scott Storch – producer, writer

Charts

Weekly charts

Year-end charts

Release history

References

2007 singles
2007 songs
Mýa songs
Lil Wayne songs
Universal Motown Records singles
Music videos directed by Benny Boom
Songs written by Poo Bear
Song recordings produced by Scott Storch
Songs written by Scott Storch
Songs written by Lil Wayne
Songs written by Mýa